The Keizersgracht ("Emperor's canal") is a canal in Amsterdam, the Netherlands. It is the second of the three main Amsterdam canals that together form the Grachtengordel, or canal belt, and lies between the inner Herengracht and outer Prinsengracht.

History 
The first part of the Keizersgracht, between Brouwersgracht and (approximately) the current Leidsegracht, was dug in the summer of 1615 at the initiative of mayor Frans Hendricksz. Oetgens, city carpenter Hendrick Jacobsz Staets and city surveyor Lucas Jansz Sinck. The Keizersgracht was named after Maximilian I, Holy Roman Emperor. The Keizersgracht is the second of the three main canals to have been dug; the Prinsengracht was dug in 1614.

In September 1614 there arose an intention to turn the Keizersgracht into a chic boulevard without water, following the example of Lange Voorhout in The Hague. This idea was abandoned for a number of reasons. It was expected that the future buyers of lots on the Keizersgracht would want to be able to reach their home or warehouse by boat. Other considerations may have been the need for water storage, the easier supply of building and raising material, but especially the shortage of infill material. The construction of the fortifications at the same time also required a lot of infill material.

The allotment on the east side was completed in November 1615. The plots were given the same width, 30 feet, as on the Herengracht. The buildings went up quickly; by 1618 hardly any vacant lots remained.

The section between the Leidsegracht and the Amstel belongs to the fourth Amsterdam expansion of 1658. The actual digging of this part of the Keizersgracht began in 1663. In 1667 both parts of the Keizersgracht were connected to each other. The section between the Amstel and the Plantage Muidergracht was laid last. This part was named Nieuwe Keizersgracht. During the second phase in 1663, city architect Daniël Stalpaert devised an additional street between Keizersgracht and Prinsengracht, the Kerkstraat, in order to provide the canal houses with a back entrance where they could build a coach house.

In 1949 the municipality had all the trees on the canal cut down due to the elm disease, after which linden trees were planted.

Architecture and monuments 
There are many monuments and monumental canal houses on the Keizersgracht, including:

Even numbers 
102: Rode Hoed (Vrijburg), from 1630
220: Church of Our Lady, from 1854
224: Saxenburg, renewed after 1755.
242–252: Groote Keijser, built between 1620 and 1730
324: Felix Meritis, from 1787 
334-346: De Claes Reinierszhofje, from 1618 
384: The Dylan Hotel, formerly Roman Catholic Poor's Office and before that the first Theatre of Van Campen (1637-1664)
566: Keizersgrachtkerk, from 1888
672-674: The Van Raey Houses, now Museum Van Loon, from 1671
676: The Nieuwe Waalse Kerk, Keizersgracht 676, from 1856

Odd numbers 
105: d'Bruynvis, from 1763 
123: Huis met de Hoofden, from 1622
141: South Africa House
143: Keizersgracht 143, historic canal house
177: Coymanshuis, by architect Jacob van Campen, from 1625
209: De Hoop, from 1734 , restored in 2001
225: The Koopermoole, from 1746
401: Huis Marseille, from 1665, now a museum for photography
609: Foam Fotografiemuseum Amsterdam
633: Museum Geelvinck-Hinlopen
745: ING Bank

A number of buildings were built by the Amsterdam architects Philips Vingboons (1607-1678) and Adriaan Dortsman (1635-1682).

The Homomonument on the Westermarkt is in part, in the form of a jetty, above the Keizersgracht.

Numbering and orientation 
The Keizersgracht starts in the north at the Brouwersgracht, bends parallel between Herengracht and the Prinsengracht to the southeast and flows into the Amstel. The odd-numbered side of the canal is on the side of the heart of the city (Dam Square).

At Keizersgracht 200 and 183 is the intersection with Westermarkt and Raadhuisstraat
At Keizersgracht 508 and 455 is the intersection with Leidsestraat
At Keizersgracht 648 and 589 is the intersection with Vijzelstraat
At Keizersgracht 764 and 709 is the intersection with Utrechtsestraat
At Keizersgracht 826 and 765, the canal flows into the Amstel

Bridges 
The Keizersgracht is spanned by 14 bridges, all fixed.

The bridge names in parentheses are the unofficial names of bridges, names which have lapsed since April 2016.

Skating 
If ice forms in winter, there is a possibility of skating on the Amsterdam canals. Waternet will stop circulation of water in the canals by closing the locks, and boats will be prohibited from sailing on a number of canals, including the Keizersgracht. The Keizersgracht is then designated as the main canal for skating. In 2008 a tour boat from shipping company Meyers broke to pieces against the rules in the very first layer of ice; questions about this were asked to the city center district board.

The Keizersrace is a sprint race that is held between the Leidsestraat and the Spiegelgracht. The winner of the race may call himself/herself the Keizer(in) of Amsterdam. The race was held in 1991, 1996, 1997 and 2012.

Tunnel 
The so-called Poentunnel was opened below the Keizersgracht in 1974, an underground walking route between the De Bazel and Vijzelbank bank buildings in Vijzelstraat. Today, the tunnel is still present, but out of use and bricked up on the north side.

Famous residents 
 8?: Joan van Oosterwijck, governor of the VOC, WIC and Society of Suriname
 Willem Cornelisz van Muyden lived not far from the Greenland warehouses. He attached a signboard, 'The First Whale', to his spacious home.
 65: Pieter Corneliszoon Hooft and his wife Leonora Hellemans. After his death, his widow bought the property that the couple had lived in for years.
 71, 73 and 127: Cornelis Trip
 111 and 113: Hendrik Carloff and Jan Valckenburgh. They were both involved in the slave trade between the Gold Coast and South America.
 123: Czech pedagogue John Amos Comenius, who had moved in with Louis de Geer
 137-139: Samuel Blommaert 
 139: Hugo Metsers
 141: Laurens Reael and Jacques Specx
 149: Hans van Loon, governor of the VOC and Boudewijn Büch
 198: Hendrick van Baerle. He was involved in slave transports to Suriname 
 209: Gerrit Reynst and Jan Reynst, art collectors
 210: The doctor and mayor Nicolaes Tulp
 217: Daniël Deutz, mayor of Amsterdam, the lawyer Jacob Walraven, Jan Heemskerk., and his son Theo Heemskerk, both home affairs minister.
 224: David van Baerle, the merchant Jean de Neufville and Pieter van Winter, art collectors
 285: Kiliaen van Rensselaer, his neighbor was Jacques l'Hermite
 289: Van Hall family, possibly the birthplace of Walraven van Hall 
 Johan van Scharphuizen lived next to the Theatre of Van Campen, and later also Carel Wouter Visscher 
 317: Christoffer Brands 
 319: the actor Rutger Hauer 
 385: Jacob de Wit
 444-446: the Openbare Bibliotheek Amsterdam (Amsterdam Public Library) until 2007, Mattheus Lestevenon, the ambassador in France, and the bankers and art collectors Thomas Hope, Henry Hope and Adriaan van der Hoop 
 452: Van Loon family and Gerard Arnout Hasselaer
 At the Molenpad, Pieter and François Hemony established their bell foundry. The first Italian opera was performed on the site in 1680 by Dirck Strijcker.

 456: the surgeon David van Gesscher 
 458: Frederick Coyett, the last governor of Dutch Formosa.
 Between the Leidsegracht and the Leidsestraat on the even side lived the poet Nicolaas Simon van Winter
 492: Hans van Willigenburg 
 515: Actor Chris Zegers
 518 Benno Premsela has lived for decades here, and rebuilt it in his characteristic style.
 529: Once the home of America's second president, John Adams.
 560: Jacob van Lennep
 565?: Gerrit van Uylenburgh, art dealer.
 592 and 418: wallpaper painter Egbert van Drielst
 601: Ferdinand van Collen 
 643: Matthias Trip
 668: Mayor Cornelis Munter
 672: Ferdinand Bol, painter
 686: Johannes Burman, botanist
 755: Paulien Huizinga
 Cosimo III de' Medici stayed at an unknown number with the wool and slave trader Francesco Feroni

See also 
Canals of Amsterdam

Notes

Sources

External links
Overzicht Keizersgracht even zijde - amsterdamsegrachtenhuizen.info
Overzicht Keizersgracht oneven zijde - amsterdamsegrachtenhuizen.info

1615 establishments in the Dutch Republic
Canals opened in 1615
Canals in Amsterdam
Maximilian I, Holy Roman Emperor